Adriana Barbu (born 17 January 1961) is a retired female long-distance runner from Romania, who specialized in the marathon race.

Barbu is best known for winning the bronze medal in the classic distance at the 1994 European Championships in Helsinki, clocking 2:30.55. She also triumphed in the 1987 edition of the Amsterdam Marathon on 10 May 1987, in 2:36.21.

She also won the 1995 Paris Half Marathon.

Achievements

References

1961 births
Living people
Romanian female long-distance runners
Romanian female marathon runners
European Athletics Championships medalists